Chistopolyansky is a rural locality (a settlement) in Brasovsky District, Bryansk Oblast, Russia. The population was 64 as of 2013.

References 

Rural localities in Brasovsky District